Qi (pronounced  ; from the Chinese word 气 qi; traditional Chinese: 氣) is an interface standard for wireless power transfer using inductive charging.

The Qi standard is developed by the Wireless Power Consortium. As a universal, open standard Qi-enabled devices are able to connect to Qi chargers from any manufacturer. 

Qi was first released in 2008, and by 2017 was incorporated into more than 200 smartphones, tablets and other devices. , there are 488 manufacturers working with the standard including Apple, Asus, Google, Huawei, LG Electronics, Samsung, Xiaomi and Sony.

In January 2023, the consortium announced Qi2, which will update the existing standard and include a magnetic connection based on Apple's MagSafe technology.

Design 

Devices that operate using the Qi standard rely on electromagnetic induction between planar coils. A Qi system consists of two types of devices – the Base Station, which is connected to a power source and provides inductive power, and Mobile Devices, which consume inductive power. The Base Station contains a power transmitter that comprises a transmitting coil that generates an oscillating magnetic field; the Mobile Device contains a power receiver holding a receiving coil. The magnetic field induces an alternating current in the receiving coil by Faraday's law of induction. Close spacing of the two coils, as well as shielding on their surfaces, ensure the inductive power transfer is efficient.

Base Stations typically have a flat surface – referred to as the Interface Surface – on top of which a user can place one or more Mobile Devices. There are two methods for aligning the transmitting coil (part of the Base Station) and receiving coil (part of the Mobile Device) in order for a power transfer to happen. In the first concept – called guided positioning – a user must place the Mobile Device on a certain location of the Base Station's surface. For this purpose, the Mobile Device provides an alignment aid that is appropriate to its size, shape and function. The second concept – referred to as free positioning – does not require the user to place the Mobile Device in direct alignment with the transmitting coil. There are several ways to achieve free positioning. In one example a bundle of transmitting coils is used to generate a magnetic field at the location of the receiving coil only. Another example uses mechanical means to move a single transmitting coil underneath the receiving coil. A third option is to use a technique called "Multiple Cooperative Flux Generators."

Figure 1-1 illustrates the basic system configuration. As shown, a power transmitter includes two main functional units – a power conversion unit and a communications and control unit. The diagram shows the transmitting coil (array) generating the magnetic field as part of the power conversion unit. The control and communications unit regulates the transferred power to the level that the power receiver requests. The diagram also demonstrates that a Base Station may contain numerous transmitters, allowing for multiple Mobile Devices to be placed on the same Base Station and inductively charge until each of its batteries are fully charged. Finally, the system unit in the diagram comprises all other functionality of the Base Station, such as input power provisioning, control of multiple power transmitters, and user interfacing.

A power receiver comprises a power pick-up unit, as well as a communications and control unit. Similar to the power conversion unit of the transmitter, Figure 1-1 illustrates the receiving coil as capturing the magnetic field of the power pick-up unit. A power pick-up unit typically contains a single receiving coil only. Moreover, a Mobile Device typically contains a single power receiver. The communications and control unit regulates the transferred power to the level that is appropriate for the subsystems (e.g., battery) connected to the output of the power receiver. These subsystems represent the main functionality of the Mobile Device.

Transmitters 
As an example from the 2017 version 1.2.2 of the Qi specification (referenced above), the A2 reference Qi low-power transmitter has a coil of 20 turns (in two layers) in a flat coil, wound on a form with a 19 mm inner diameter and a 40 mm outer diameter, with a below-coil shield of soft iron at least 4 mm larger in diameter which gives an inductance of 24±1 microhenries. This coil is placed in a series resonant circuit. 

This series resonant circuit is then driven by an H-bridge switching arrangement from the DC source; at full power, the voltage in the capacitor can reach 50 volts. Power control is automatic; the Qi specification requires that the actual voltage applied be controllable in steps at least as small as 50 millivolts.

Rather than down-regulate the charging voltage in the device, Qi chargers meeting the A2 reference use a PID (proportional-integral-derivative) controller to modulate the delivered power according to the primary cell voltage.

Other Qi charge transmitters start their connections at 140 kHz, but can change frequencies to find a frequency with a better match, as the mutual inductance between transmitter and receiver coils will vary according to the standoff distance between transmitter and receiver coils, and thus the natural resonance frequency will vary. Different Qi reference designs have different coil arrangements, including oval coil and multi-coil systems as well as more complex resonance networks with multiple inductors and capacitors. These designs allow frequency-agile operation at frequencies from 105 to 205 kHz and with maximum resonant circuit voltages as high as 200 volts.

Receivers 
The Qi power receiver hardware reference design 1, also from version 1.2.2 of the Qi specification, starts with a rectangular coil of wire 44 mm x 30 mm outside size, with 14 turns of wire, and with an above-coil magnetic shield. This coil is wired into a parallel resonant circuit with a pair of capacitors (of 127 nanofarads in series and 1.6 nanofarads in parallel). The power output is taken across the 1.6 nanofarad capacitor.

In order to provide a digital communications channel back to the power transmitter, a resonance modulator consisting of a pair of 22 nanofarad capacitors and a 10 kΩ resistor in a T configuration can be switched across the 1.6 nanofarad capacitor. Switching the T network across the 1.6 nano-farad capacitor causes a significant change in the resonant frequency of the coupled system that is detected by the power transmitter as a change in the delivered power.

Power output to the portable device is via a full-wave bridge wired across the 1.6-nanofarad capacitor; the power is typically filtered with a 20-microfarad capacitor before delivery to the charge controller.

Other Qi power receivers use alternate resonance modulators, including switching a resistor or pair of resistors across the receiver resonator capacitor, both before and after the bridge rectifier.

Features and specifications 

The WPC published the Qi low-power specification in August 2009. The Qi specification can be downloaded freely after registration. Under the Qi specification, "low power" inductive transfers deliver power below 5 W using inductive coupling between two planar coils. These coils are typically 5 mm apart but can be up to 40 mm and possibly further apart. The Qi low-power specification has been renamed to the Qi Baseline Power Profile (BPP).

Regulation of the output voltage is provided by a digital control loop where the power receiver communicates with the power transmitter and requests more or less power. Communication is unidirectional from the power receiver to the power transmitter via backscatter modulation. In backscatter modulation, the power-receiver coil is loaded, changing the current draw at the power transmitter. These current changes are monitored and demodulated into the information required for the two devices to work together.

In 2011, the Wireless Power Consortium began to extend the Qi specification to medium power. As of 2019, the Medium Power standard currently delivers 30 to 65 W. It is expected to eventually support up to 200 W (typically used for portable power tools, robotic vacuum cleaners, drones and e-bikes).

In 2015, the WPC also demonstrated a high-power specification, called "Ki", that will deliver up to 1 kW, allowing the powering of kitchen appliances among other high-power utilities.

In 2015, WPC introduced the Qi Extended Power Profile (EPP) specification which supports up to 15 W. EPP is also typically used to charge mobile devices like BPP. Phone companies that support EPP include LG, Sony, Xiaomi, and Sharp.

WPC introduced Proprietary Power Delivery Extension (PPDE) to allow phone OEMs to deliver higher than Baseline Power Profile's 5 W or the Extended Power Profile's 15 W. Currently, only Samsung has published their compliance test. Other phone companies that use proprietary standards for fast wireless charging include Apple, Huawei and Google.

Adoption 
Nokia first adopted Qi in its Lumia 920, and Samsung Mobile on the Galaxy S3 (supported via a retrofittable official Samsung back cover accessory) in 2012, the Google/LG Nexus 4 followed later that year. Toyota began offering a Qi charging cradle as a factory option on its 2013 Avalon Limited, with Ssangyong the second car manufacturer to offer a Qi option, also in 2013.

In 2015, a survey found that 76% of people surveyed in the United States and China were aware of wireless charging (an increase from 36% the previous year), and 20% were using it — however, only 16% of those were using it daily. Furniture retailer IKEA introduced lamps and tables with integrated wireless chargers for sale in 2015, and the Lexus NX gained an optional Qi charging pad in the center console. An estimated 120 million wirelessly charging phones were sold that year, notably the Samsung Galaxy S6, which supported both Qi and the competing Power Matters Alliance standards. However, the existence of several competing wireless charging standards was still seen as a barrier to adoption.

By early 2017, Qi had displaced other competing standards such as Rezence. On September 12, 2017, Apple announced that their new smartphones, the iPhone 8, iPhone 8 Plus, and the iPhone X, would support the Qi standard. Since then, every new iPhone version has supported the Qi wireless charging standard. Apple also announced plans to expand the standard with a new protocol called AirPower which would have added the ability to charge multiple devices at once; however, this was canceled on March 29, 2019.

As the Qi standard gains popularity, it is expected that Qi Hotspots will begin to arise in places such as coffee shops, airports, sports arenas, etc. The Coffee Bean and Tea Leaf, a major US coffee chain, will install inductive charging stations at selected major metropolitan cities, as well as Virgin Atlantic, for United Kingdom's London Heathrow Airport and New York City's John F. Kennedy International Airport.

Version history

See also 
 Near-field communication
 WiPower
 Open Dots
 MagSafe

References

External links 
 

Wireless energy transfer
Computer-related introductions in 2009
Open standards
Wireless Power Consortium